Eta Telescopii (η Telescopii) is a white-hued star in the southern constellation of Telescopium. This is an A-type main sequence star with an apparent visual magnitude of +5.03. It is approximately 158 light years from Earth and is a member of the Beta Pictoris Moving Group of stars that share a common motion through space. It is moving through the Galaxy at a speed of 23.7 km/s relative to the Sun.

In 1998, imaging with the Hubble Space Telescope revealed a 12th magnitude object around 4" distant from Eta Telescopii, and calculated to be a brown dwarf of spectral type M7V or M8V with a surface temperature of around 2600 K. It is located around 192 AU distant from the primary star, and weighs between 20 and 50 Jupiter masses.

This star has 3.24 times the mass of the Sun and is radiating around 24 times the Sun's luminosity from its outer atmosphere at an effective temperature of 11,941. The age of the star is only about 12 million years. It is emitting an excess of infrared radiation that suggests the presence of a circumstellar disk of dust at an orbital radius of 24 AU, and an unresolved asteroid belt at 4 AU from the host star. Subsequent imaging showed there were no objects of 20 Jupiter masses or greater between the disk and the brown dwarf, leading the researchers Neuhäuser and colleagues to postulate that the brown dwarf had an eccentric orbit – if 200 AU were its furthest distance from the primary, then it could come as close as 71 AU with an average distance of 136 AU.

Eta Telescopii is in fact a triple star system; further away, separated by 7', is the common proper motion companion HD 181327, a yellow-white main sequence star of spectral type F6V and apparent magnitude 7.0, which has its own debris disk. This disk has a sharply-defined inner edge at 31 AU, indicating a likely planet between 19 and 31 AU from the star.

References

A-type main-sequence stars
Circumstellar disks
Beta Pictoris moving group
Telescopii, Eta
Telescopium (constellation)
Durchmusterung objects
181296
095261
7329